Choo Ken Hwa is a Malaysian politician and currently serves as Negeri Sembilan State Executive Councillor.

Election results

References 

Living people
People from Negeri Sembilan
Malaysian people of Chinese descent
Democratic Action Party (Malaysia) politicians
21st-century Malaysian politicians
Members of the Negeri Sembilan State Legislative Assembly
Negeri Sembilan state executive councillors
1977 births